is a brand of caffeinated chewing gum produced in Japan by Lotte. It has been sold since 1983. and is popular in Japan, partially due to its well-known television commercials that star Jean-Claude Van Damme. After being mentioned by Wired Magazine in 2003, which described its effect as "Sambuca spiked with Vicks VapoRub", Lotte Black Black became popular in the United States. The gum's name is derived from its charcoal-like color.

Ingredients include sugar, starch syrup, grape sugar, erythritol, oolong tea extract, ginkgo extract, chrysanthemum flower extract, gum base, flavorings, coloring agents (cacao, gardenia), caffeine, and nicotinamide.  A persistent urban legend holds that the gum contains nicotine, the misconception stemming from confusion with nicotinamide, a different substance related to the B vitamins.  There is some "Engrish" on the label that reads, "HI-TECHNICAL * EXCELLENT TASTE AND FLAVOR". Some sticks also say "YES, CHEWING!".

Notes and references

External links
Product information of Lotte's chewing gum

Lotte (conglomerate) products
Chewing gum
Products introduced in 1983